Duke of Southampton was a title in the Peerage of England. It was created in 1675 for Charles FitzRoy, an illegitimate son of King Charles II by his mistress, the 1st Duchess of Cleveland. Together with the dukedom, Charles Fitzroy also received the subsidiary titles of Earl of Chichester and Baron Newbury.

Upon his mother's death in 1709, the 1st Duke of Southampton  succeeded to her hereditary peerages (the dukedom of Cleveland, earldom of Southampton and barony of Nonsuch). At his death in 1730, the titles passed to his son William. The 2nd Duke of Southampton died without issue, so the titles became extinct upon his death in 1774. The dukedom of Southampton has not been created again. One of the heirs is the Baron Southampton, descendant of a brother of the first Duke of Southampton.

Dukes of Southampton (1675)
Charles Fitzroy, 1st Duke of Southampton, 2nd Duke of Cleveland (1662–1730)
William Fitzroy, 2nd Duke of Southampton, 3rd Duke of Cleveland (1698–1774)

See also
 Duke of Cleveland

References 

Extinct dukedoms in the Peerage of England
Noble titles created in 1675
1675 establishments in England
Dukes of Southampton